The Thing that Couldn't Die is a 1958 American horror film produced and directed by Will Cowan and starring William Reynolds, Andra Martin, Jeffrey Stone, and Carolyn Kearney. Based on an original screenplay by David Duncan for Universal Pictures, it was released in the United States on a double bill in May 1958 with the British Hammer Films classic Horror of Dracula.

Plot
Jessica Burns (Carolyn Kearney), a young woman who claims to have psychic powers, lives on a California dude ranch with her Aunt Flavia (Peggy Converse). When Jessica is called upon to dowse in search of a groundwater spring, she instead discovers a buried box dating from the 16th century. Against Jessica's warnings, Flavia takes the box back to her house. Flavia, consumed with thoughts of buried treasure, wants to open the box immediately. But Gordon Hawthorne (William Reynolds), a guest at the ranch who has shown interest in Jessica, argues the box should be kept intact for appraisal. That night, he leaves the ranch to bring an archaeologist friend to inspect the box.

However, Flavia’s greedy ranch foreman, Boyd, also anticipating treasure, secretly convinces slow-witted handyman Mike to break the cask open. Instead of gold or gemstones, the box contains the intact head of Gideon Drew (Robin Hughes), a man executed for sorcery 400 years earlier. The head awakens and telepathically controls Mike.

Drew’s head commands Mike to murder Boyd, then has the handyman conceal it while arranging to have a coffin retrieved containing Drew’s body. The head takes control of Linda (Andra Martin), another ranch guest. She places the head in a hat box inside a guest room closet. Flavia and Jessica discover Boyd’s body and call the police.

Gordon and his historian acquaintance, Julian Ash, arrive back at the ranch. Mike, still apparently under Drew’s control, approaches the police officers in a threatening manner holding the knife that killed Boyd. The officers shoot him dead.

Once his head and body are joined, Drew will be fully able to exercise his powers, though his plan isn’t entirely clear. Jessica senses the evil and is protected from the head's influence by a fleur-de-lis amulet she wears around her neck. But when Gordon removes the amulet so its historical value could be appraised, Drew’s head assumes control of her mind.

Reading text engraved on the box’s corroded metal surface, Julian and Gordon discover the existence of a coffin also buried on the property that contains Drew’s body. Under Drew’s control, Jessica and Linda retrieve the head, while Gordon, Julian and ranch guest Hank dig up the casket.

The coffin is opened inside the house, and Jessica reunites the head to its body. Gideon arises from his coffin and threatens to feast on the blood of the ranch’s modern residents. Gordon, somehow aware of the amulet’s power, catches the monster off guard and thrusts the necklace toward Drew. This forces Drew back into the coffin and, when the fleur-de-lis is tossed in with his body, the group watches the total disintegration of his mortal remains.

Cast
 William Reynolds as Gordon Hawthorne
 Andra Martin as Linda Madison
 Jeffrey Stone as Hank Huston 
 Carolyn Kearney as Jessica Burns
 Peggy Converse as Flavia McIntyre
 Robin Hughes as Gideon Drew
 James Anderson as Boyd Abercrombie
 Charles Horvath as Mike
 Forrest Lewis as Julian Ash

Legacy
The plot of this film is likely to have inspired the "head of Judah Zachary" plotline in the 1966-1971 gothic television serial Dark Shadows and the 1972 Euro-Horror film Horror Rises from the Tomb. It was riffed on Mystery Science Theater 3000, in episode 805. "Thing That Couldn't Die" is included on the Shout! Factory Blu-ray release "Universal Horror Collection: Volume 6" and comes with a Tom Weaver commentary that provides information about the making of the movie.

References

External links

 
 
 
 
 MST3K Episode Guide: The Thing that Couldn't Die

1958 horror films
1958 films
Universal Pictures films
Films scored by Henry Mancini
Films with screenplays by David Duncan (writer)
1950s English-language films